A pear is a tree of the genus Pyrus and the fruit of that tree, edible in some species.

Pear or Pears may also refer to:

Arts, entertainment, and media
 Pear (Annoying Orange), a character in Annoying Orange
 Pears' Cyclopaedia, a one-volume encyclopædia published in the United Kingdom

Brands and enterprises
 Pear (company), a sponsorship and fundraising company
 Pears (soap), a British brand of soap
 Worcestershire County Cricket Club, traditionally nicknamed the "Pears", based on their badge of a pear tree or three black pears

Colors and shapes
 Pear (color), a shade of green
 Pear, a human female body shape

Cultures
 Pear language, an endangered Mon-Khmer language of Cambodia
 Pear people, an indigenous group in Cambodia and Thailand

Food & Taxonomy 
 Prickly pear (disambiguation)
 Pyrus (disambiguation)
 Avocado, a fruit that is referred to as "pear" in certain countries

Places
 Pear (Užice), a village in the vicinity of Užice, Serbia
 Pear, West Virginia, an unincorporated community in the United States

Science and technology
 PearPC, an open-source PowerPC emulator
 PHP Extension and Application Repository (PEAR), a computer programming framework and distribution system for PHP code components
 Polymerase-endonuclease amplification reaction (PEAR)
 Princeton Engineering Anomalies Research Lab (PEAR), a now disbanded program which attempted to study the paranormal

Other uses
 Pears (surname)
 Pear Tree House, a civil defence control centre in London
 Choke pear (torture), or Pear of Anguish, an implement of torture
 Province de L'Eglise Anglicane au Rwanda (PEAR), the  French  name for the Anglican Church of Rwanda

See also
 Choke pear (disambiguation)
 Pear-shaped (disambiguation)